Fukuia kurodai is a species of amphibious freshwater snail with an operculum, an aquatic gastropod mollusk in the family Pomatiopsidae.

Fukuia kurodai is the type species of the genus Fukuia.

Subspecies 
There are two subspecies of Fukuia kurodai:
 Fukuia kurodai kurodai Abbott & Hunter, 1949
 Fukuia kurodai niigataensis Minato, 1973

Distribution 
This species is endemic to Honshu, Japan.

Ecology 
This species is a freshwater snail which lives in mountain streamlets. It is also an amphibious snail and it is often arboreal.

References

External links 
 
 

Pomatiopsidae
Gastropods described in 1949